The SC 2000 (Sprengbombe Cylindrisch) or cylindrical explosive bomb in English was a general-purpose bomb used by the Luftwaffe during World War II.

Design 
The SC 2000 had a single piece forged and machined steel body and was similar to the preceding SC 1800 in construction.  Around the nose of the bomb was a kopfring - a metal ring, triangular in cross section, designed to prevent ground penetration or to stop forward momentum when hitting water.  The SC 2000 was filled with Amatol, had a single transverse fuze like the SC 1800 and a central exploder tube which ran through the explosives.  The SC 2000 had a circular braced tail ring with four fins.  Inside the bomb casing there was a reinforced H-type suspension lug and it could be horizontally suspended in a bomb bay or horizontally mounted on a fuselage hardpoint.  There were also lugs that could be fitted for dive bombing.

References

World War II aerial bombs of Germany